N. W. "Dooch" Sherman was a college football and basketball player. He  was a prominent quarterback for the Vanderbilt Commodores football team, the inaugural winner of the Porter Cup as the school's best all-around athlete.

References

American football quarterbacks
Vanderbilt Commodores football players